The Chicago and Northwestern Railroad Depot in Powder River, Wyoming, also known as Powder River Train Station, was built in 1910.  It was listed on the National Register of Historic Places in 1988.

It was one of only two stations built by the Chicago & Northwestern Railroad in all of Natrona County, the other being a brick structure in Casper.

A garage or shed on the property is a second contributing building.

References

Railway stations on the National Register of Historic Places in Wyoming
National Register of Historic Places in Natrona County, Wyoming
Railway stations in the United States opened in 1910
Powder River
Former railway stations in Wyoming
1910 establishments in Wyoming